Glaubicz - is a Polish Coat of Arms.

See also

 Polish heraldry
 Heraldic family
 List of Polish nobility coats of arms

Bibliography 
 Nieznana szlachta polska i jej herby - Wiktor Wittyg

External links
 https://web.archive.org/web/20150103222016/http://genealogia.grocholski.pl/

Polish coats of arms